Kristján Jóhannsson (10 December 1929 – 24 January 2013) was an Icelandic long-distance runner. He competed in the men's 5000 metres at the 1952 Summer Olympics.

References

1929 births
2013 deaths
Athletes (track and field) at the 1952 Summer Olympics
Kristjan Johannsson
Kristjan Johannsson
Place of birth missing